(born December 26, 1969) is a Japanese composer.  He has worked on several different anime shows, including the Aria series, Inari, Konkon, Koi Iroha, and the Himawari! series. Along with Shigeharu Sasago he was music director of the Aria soundtracks, which he composed with Choro Club. He also co-composed the music for the live action series Ariadne no Dangan and produced the soundtrack for the film Sweet Little Lies.

Works
 Aria the Animation
 Ariadne no Dangan
 Inari, Konkon, Koi Iroha
 Himawari!
 Sweet Little Lies
 School Lunch of Ashiya City (2022)

References

External links
 
 Oricon profile
 List of Takeshi Senoo's albums ranked on Oricon
 
 
 Takeshi Senoo anime at Media Arts Database 

1969 births
Anime composers
Gr8! Records artists
Japanese composers
Japanese film score composers
Japanese male composers
Japanese male film score composers
Living people
Musicians from Hyōgo Prefecture